Them or THEM, a third-person plural accusative personal pronoun, may refer to:

Books 
 Them (novel), 3rd volume (1969) in American Joyce Carol Oates' Wonderland Quartet
 Them: Adventures with Extremists, 2003 non-fiction by Welsh journalist Jon Ronson
 Them: A Novel, 2007 debut by American Nathan McCall

Comics 
 THEM! (comics), American DC comic book characters
 Them, American Marvel comic book characters, see Advanced Idea Mechanics

Film 
 Them!, a 1954 American science fiction film about giant ants
 Them (2006 film), French-Romanian horror film starring Olivia Bonamy and Michael Cohen

Music 
 Them (band), Northern Irish rock band featuring Van Morrison
 The Angry Young Them, their 1965 debut album, released in US as Them
 Them (King Diamond album), 1988
 Themselves, band formerly known as Them
 Them (Themselves album), 2000
 “Them”, song by Carly Simon from her 1980 album Come Upstairs
 “Them”, song by The Cranberries released as bonus track on 2002 edition of their 1993 album Everybody Else Is Doing It, So Why Can't We?
 “Them”, song from 2011 album Unseen by The Haunted

Television 
 Them (TV series), a 2021 American television series on Prime Video
 "Them" (The Walking Dead), a 2015 episode of AMC television series The Walking Dead

Other uses 
 Them (website), American online LGBT magazine
 Them, Denmark, town in Silkeborg municipality

See also 
 Us and Them (disambiguation)

Modern English personal pronouns